The 2007–08 Icelandic Hockey League season was the 17th season of the Icelandic Hockey League, the top level of ice hockey in Iceland. Four teams participated in the league, and Skautafelag Akureyrar won the championship.

Regular season

Final 
 Skautafélag Akureyrar - Skautafélag Reykjavíkur 3:1 (5:0 Forfeit, 4:0, 1:6, 9:5)

External links 
 2007-08 season.info

Icelandic Hockey League
Icelandic Hockey League seasons
2007–08 in Icelandic ice hockey